Viola hirsutula, common name southern woodland violet, is a perennial species of violet found in the eastern United States.

Conservation status
It is listed extirpated in Indiana, endangered in New York, and as a special concern and believed extirpated in Connecticut.

References

Flora of the Eastern United States
hirsutula